Apantesis bolanderi is a moth of the family Erebidae. It was described by Stretch in 1872. It is only known from Mount Shasta in California.

The wingspan is about 25 mm. The ground colour of the forewings is blackish brown with a yellowish anal margin. The hindwings are rose with  black markings. Adults are probably on wing in spring or early summer.

This species was formerly a member of the genus Grammia, but was moved to Apantesis along with the other species of the genera Grammia, Holarctia, and Notarctia.

References

 Natural History Museum Lepidoptera generic names catalog

Arctiina
Moths described in 1872